Robert A. Wieckowski (born February 18, 1955) is an American attorney and politician who served in the California State Senate. A Democrat, he represented the 10th Senate District, which encompassed the central and southern portions of the East Bay and South Bay.

He announced a bid to replace Eric Swalwell as the representative for California's 15th congressional district, but dropped out a few weeks later.

Biography
Wieckowski is a small business owner and a bankruptcy attorney.  He received his B.A. from University of California, Berkeley and his J.D. from Santa Clara University Law School.

Wieckowski was first elected to the California State Assembly in 2010 to represent the 20th Assembly District, then the 25th Assembly District in 2012 after redistricting. Before being elected to the Legislature, he served as Vice-Mayor and a City Councilman in Fremont.

Wieckowski served as chair of the Assembly Judiciary Committee. He was also a member of the Assembly Insurance, Health, and Public Employees, Retirement and Social Security committees.

In his first term in office, Wieckowski passed 24 bills through the Legislature, 21 of which were signed into law by California Governor Jerry Brown. He launched the Made in California Jobs Initiative to expand California manufacturing, invest in biotechnology research, and fight for small businesses.

Wieckowski lives in Fremont with his wife, Sue Lemke, and her son Luke. Wieckowski's parents are Gene and Helen Wieckowski.

References

External links

Ballotpedia article on Bob Wieckowski
Project Vote Smart - Bob Wieckowski

Join California Bob Wieckowski

1955 births
Living people
California city council members
Democratic Party members of the California State Assembly
Democratic Party California state senators
California lawyers
People from Fremont, California
Santa Clara University alumni
University of California, Berkeley alumni
San Francisco Bay Area politicians
American politicians of Polish descent
21st-century American politicians
Candidates in the 2020 United States elections
Appropriations Committee member, California State Senate